Andrew Smith (born in Liverpool in 1970) is a composer whose works include settings of Ave Maria, Regina caeli, Ave Maris stella, Veni redemptor gentium, Flos regalis virginalis (based on one of the Worcester Fragments) and Magnificat à 4. He has written works for Trio Mediaeval and New York Polyphony. He is published by OUP as well as by Norsk Musikforlag and Musikk-Husets Forlag.

Andrew Smith settled in Norway in 1984. He has worked for the Ultima Oslo Contemporary Music Festival and as choirmaster of Oslo's English Church. He currently works for the Norwegian music publishers Norsk Musikforlag in Oslo.

Andrew Smith's music has been performed by leading Norwegian choirs including Ensemble 96, Schola Cantorum (Norwegian choir), Grex Vocalis, Kammerkoret NOVA, The Norwegian Girls Choir, and cathedral choirs in Oslo, Bergen and Trondheim. His work has been commissioned and performed abroad by, among others, Trio Mediaeval (Norway), New York Polyphony, the Girl Choristers of Washington National Cathedral, Sete Lágrimas (Portugal), Cappella Nova (Scotland), Lorelei Ensemble (Boston, USA), and The District Eight (New York, USA).

Recent works include Requiem (2012) for equal voices, organ and improvising trumpet which was premiered in Trondheim and subsequently at three venues in the UK by Arve Henriksen, Ståle Storløkken and Choralia (dir. Christopher Finch). Gothic Voices (UK) commissioned Stond wel, Moder under Rode which was premiered in London in March 2015.

Autumn/winter 2017 sees the premier performance of four new works: Spor for Det norske jentekor (The Norwegian Girls' Choir) to a commissioned text by Sarah Camille Ramin Osmundsen; Til Foraaret, a setting of a poem written by Norwegian poet Henrik Wergeland on his deathbed; LUX for Trio Mediaeval and Nils Økland; and Et ecce terrae motus II for Oslo Cathedral Choir and Gothic Voices.

Andrew's composition Veni, O Oriens was one of the 10 winning entries of the ORTUS INternational New Music Competition and will be performedon 23 September by New York chamber choir Khorikos.

5 November 2017 saw a new performance of the Requiem in Trondheim's Nidaros Cathedral by Nidarosdomens jentekor (Nidaros Cathedral Girls' Choir) featuring Arve Henriksen and Ståle Storløkken, and subsequent recording for 2L in January 2018 featuring Trygve Seim on saxophones.

List of works
Antiphons (2019) for SATB. Commissioned by KHORIKOS, New York City. First performance 13 & 14 December 2019.
Inspiration (2019) for SATB. Commissioned by Dr. Michael Murphy and the Stephen F. Austin State University A Cappella Choir. First performance 18 October 2019.
Ubi caritas (2019) for SSA. Commissioned by Trio Mediaeval. First performance 20 April 2019 at Wigmore Hall.
Vinea mea electa (2019) for SATB. Motet from Lukaspasjon.
Lukaspasjon (2019) for SATB. Commissioned by Oslo Cathedral Choir. First performance 19 April 2019 at Oslo Cathedral.
I Oletjedn, i Olekjinn (2018) (arr. for SATB) commissioned by Øystre Slidre Sanglag, Norway
Sett meg som et segl på ditt hjerte (2018) (SATB) for Oslo Cathedral Choir performed at a service to celebrate the golden wedding anniversary of the king and queen of Norway
Når mitt øye, trett av møye and Dagsens auga sloknar ut (2018) (arr. for SATB) for Oslo Cathedral Choir
Et ecce terrae motus II (2018) (SATB+MezTBar) Commissioned for Oslo Cathedral Choir and Gothic Voices
Spor, Trøst, Gnist (2017) (SSAA) Words: Sarah Camille Ramin Osmundsen. Commissioned by Det norske jentekor
Til Foraaret (2017) (SATB) Words: Henrik Wergeland. Commissioned by Grex Vocalis
Salvator mundi (2016) (SSATBarB) Commissioned by the choir of St Barnabas' Church, Ottawa
Crux fidelis (2016) (SATB div.)
My mistress' eyes are nothing like the sun (2015) (TTBB) Commissioned by Den norske Studentersangforening, Oslo
Hodie Christus natus est (2015) (ATBarB with harp intro) Commissioned by Consortium Vocale Oslo
Oimè il bel viso (2015) (SSATB) Commissioned by Grex Vocalis
Stand wel, Moder, under rode (2015) (MezTTB) Commissioned by Gothic Voices
Tre latinske salmer (2015) (SATB and strings) Commissioned for Cathedra, Washington National Cathedral
Amid a crowd of stars (2014) (SATB or ATBarB solo and SATB choir) Commissioned for New York Polyphony and Trinity Univ. Chamber Singers, USA
An die Musik (2014) (SSATBB div.)
Songs of Solomon (2013) (Sinfonietta/SSA) Commissioned by Kristiansund Kirke Kulturakademi
Lasciatemi morire (2013) (SSATBB div.) Commissioned by Kammerkoret NOVA, Oslo
Zefiro torna (2013) (SSATBB div.) Commissioned by Kammerkoret NOVA, Oslo
Requiem (2012) (Improvising trumpet/organ/choir SSA div.) Commissioned by Nidaros Cathedral Girls Choir

References

External links
Home page
Singing group Trio Mediaeval
Singing group New York Polyphony
Veni redemptor gentium at OUP
Andrew Smith at 2L Records
Andrew Smith's published music at Norsk Musikforlag

1970 births
Living people
British composers